The 1998 FA Trophy Final was the 29th final of the FA Trophy, the Football Association's cup competition for levels 5–8 of the English football league system. It was contested by Cheltenham Town and Southport on 17 May 1998 at Wembley, London.

Cheltenham Town won the match 1–0 to win the first major silverware in the club's history.

Match

Details

References

FA Trophy Finals
Fa Trophy Final
Fa Trophy Final 1998
Fa Trophy Final 1998
FA Trophy Final
Events at Wembley Stadium
FA Trophy Final